Témoignage may refer to :
 Témoignage (book), a 2006 book written by French President Nicolas Sarkozy

Témoignages may refer to :
 Témoignages (TV series), a 1973 French TV series by Jean-Marie Périer
 , a French daily newspaper edited by the Communist Party of Réunion